Graphmatica is a graphing program created by Keith Hertzer, a graduate of the University of California, Berkeley.  It runs on Microsoft Windows (all versions), Mac OS X 10.5 and higher, and iOS 5.0 and higher.

Graphmatica for Windows and Macs is distributed free of charge for evaluation purposes.  After one month, non-commercial users are asked to pay a $25 licensing fee.  Other licensing plans are available for commercial users.

Graphmatica for iOS is distributed via the Apple App Store.

Capabilities
Graphmatica can graph Cartesian functions, relations, and inequalities, plus polar, parametric and ordinary differential equations.

See also
C.a.R.
KmPlot

References

External links

Cross-platform software
Mathematical software